The Aeroflot passenger fleet consists of narrow-body and wide-body aircraft from six aircraft families: the Airbus A320, the Airbus A330, the Airbus A350, the Boeing 737, the Boeing 777, and the Sukhoi Superjet 100. As of July 2022, there are 181 passenger aircraft registered in the Aeroflot fleet.

For most of its history, Aeroflot's fleet consisted almost entirely of aircraft built by Soviet manufacturers such as Antonov, Ilyushin, and Tupolev. Following the Soviet Union's dissolution and subsequent partition of the airline, Aeroflot began replacing its old Soviet aircraft with modern Western and some new-generation Russian models. Aeroflot's CEO Vitaly Saveliev intends to make its fleet younger in accordance with its corporate strategy to keep the airline competitive with other international airlines.

Current 
The Aeroflot fleet comprises the following aircraft:

Retired

History and recent developments 
During the Soviet era, almost all Aeroflot's airliners were built by Soviet manufacturers. During the 1940s and the early 1950s, the main aircraft was the Lisunov Li-2 a license-built version of the Douglas DC-3. The first to be produced in the Soviet Union was completed in 1939. DC-3s modified by fitting Soviet-made engines, named the PS-84, were also used later. The Li-2 would be replaced by the Ilyushin Il-12, which entered service in 1947, and the Ilyushin Il-14, which entered service in 1954. Aeroflot also operated thousands of the Antonov An-2 STOL biplane (first flying in 1947), in passenger and cargo roles. The An-2 remained in service until the 1980s.

The Tu-104 was the USSR's first jet airliner. Likewise, Moscow–Prague was the first international route served with the Silver Arrow.

In 1962, Aeroflot began operating the Tupolev Tu-124, the smaller version of the Tu-104, on regional routes. These were later replaced by the Tupolev Tu-134, which entered service in 1967. It also served international routes, such as Moscow] ] to Tokyo in conjunction with Japan Airlines, as well as the Moscow–Havana route, which started on —the airline's longest non-stop service at that time. The first Ilyushin Il-62 long-range four-engined airliner entered service with Aeroflot in 1967, with an inaugural flight from Moscow to Montreal on 15 September. It was complemented, in 1972, by medium-range Tupolev Tu-154. This jet is the most popular Russian airliner, with more than 1,000 made. The Tu-154M variant was delivered to Aeroflot in 1984.

The carrier started flying the supersonic Tupolev Tu-144 on freighter services in 1975. That month, an aircraft of the type was written off after an emergency landing following an electrical failure, withdrawing political support to the project and putting an end to the production.

The aircraft was phased out by the end of 2006.

The first Western-made aircraft, the Airbus A310, was incorporated into the fleet in 1992. This milestone also made Aeroflot the first Russian customer for Airbus. The Ex-Im Bank approved the loan in early 1996. Later on these four aircraft were also exempted from paying customs taxes.

From 1998 to 2005, Aeroflot leased two Boeing 777s, using the type on routes to the USA.

Matters came to a head in September 2006 as Aeroflot's board of directors convened to vote on the Boeing contract. This coincided with the USA imposing sanctions on various Russian companies (including a major aircraft maker, Sukhoi) for allegedly supplying Iran in violation of the US's Iran Nonproliferation Act of 2000 and with the Russian state-owned Vneshtorgbank buying 5% of the stock in EADS, the corporation behind Airbus. The state's representatives on the board abstained from the vote and another round of lobbying ensued, with Russian news sources reporting Aeroflot's efforts to placate the state by offering to order both 22 Boeing 787s and 22 Airbus 350s, effectively doubling its long-range fleet. Banker Alexander Lebedev, the man behind National Reserve Corporation, reached a deal with Boeing to prolong the deadline, using his corporation's money.

In , Aeroflot signed a memorandum of understanding with Airbus for the acquisition of 22 Airbus A350 XWBs, and 10 Airbus A330-200s. The transaction for the A350 XWBs was formalised late that year in a deal worth  billion. The handover of the first A350 XWB was due to take place in 2015. Delivery has been delayed by three years, with the first aircraft to enter the fleet in 2018. The Airbus A330 order was split into five A330-200s and five A330-300s, scheduled to arrive on an operating lease starting in late 2008. The first Airbus A330 entered the fleet in late 2008; it was an A330-200 and was initially put into service on the Moscow–St. Petersburg route for testing purposes. Despite the A330s having been initially aimed at providing interim capacity ahead of the arrival of both the Airbus A350s and the Boeing 787s the company had previously ordered, the type has been gradually incorporated into the fleet on a long-term basis. During the 2015 Paris Air Show, Aeroflot cancelled the Dreamliner order.

In , Finnair announced the sale of its last two self-owned McDonnell Douglas MD-11s to Aeroflot which became part of the Russian airline's cargo fleet in 2008 and 2009. On 31 December 2007, Aeroflot retired the last Tupolev Tu-134 after 40 years in service; the last flight flew the Kaliningrad–Moscow route. Aeroflot was forced to withdraw these aircraft from service due to noise restrictions. Fourteen Tu-134s comprised the type's fleet by that time; they were offered for sale to the sister companies. The retirement of the last Tupolev Tu-154 occurred on 14 January 2010, after 40 years of service; the last flight the type operated was Yekaterinburg–Moscow, taking place on 31 December 2009.

In September 2005, the company suspended direct flights between Moscow and Seattle.

In 2005, Aeroflot ordered 30 Sukhoi Superjet 100 aircraft with 98 seats in one class. Later, the airline decided to upgrade the avionics (FMS and weather radar) and modify the aircraft configuration to have 87 seats in two classes, with extra cabin crew seat, lavatory and galley. To avoid delivery delays, the first 10 SSJ100s were delivered with the original "light" specification; subsequent aircraft were updated ("full").

In the first half of 2014, Sukhoi began to replace Aeroflot's "light" aircraft by "full" versions. The last "full" version was delivered in June 2014; "light" aircraft are operated by other Russian airlines.

In , Aeroflot announced a new A330 order during the Farnborough Airshow, this time for 11 A330-300s. On 1 September 2010, Aeroflot announced that it had plans to order a total of 126 Russian-built aircraft by 2020. The aircraft to be purchased are Irkut MS-21s, Sukhoi Superjet 100s, Antonov An-140s, and Antonov An-148s. The aircraft are to be used for fleet replacement in Aeroflot, as well as six other airlines of which Aeroflot is taking control. In , the carrier ordered eight Boeing 777-300ERs; later that year the order was boosted to sixteen aircraft. The first Boeing 777-300ER was handed over to the airline on 30 January 2013. Following delivery, it was planned to deploy the aircraft on the Moscow–Bangkok route, yet certification issues postponed these plans for days, as permission to operate the aircraft was granted a few days later. In addition to the current firm contract for 30 Sukhoi Superjet 100 aircraft, Aeroflot signed a letter of intent for a further 20 of the aircraft, announced in 2015.

Aeroflot retired its three McDonnell Douglas MD-11 freighters from active service in  citing their operation as no longer profitable.

In 2015 the company expanded its fleet with three Boeing 777-300ERs, six 737-800s and four Sukhoi Superjets; and retired five Ilyushin Il-96s. During the 2015 Paris Air Show, Aeroflot cancelled an order for 22 Boeing 787 Dreamliners. In mid-2016 a deal for a further 10 leased Sukhoi Superjets was announced. In November 2016, Aeroflot cancelled eight Airbus A350-800s from an order including these aircraft and 14 A350-900s and also announced that its cancelled Boeing 787 order would be transferred to Rostec subsidiary Avia Capital Services.

Aeroflot firmed up an order for 20 Sukhoi Superjet 100s in July 2017 during the MAKS Air Show. One month later, the airliner then approved plans to purchase additional 6 new Boeing 777-300ER to significantly strengthen the long-haul capabilities of its fleet, with deliveries of the aircraft scheduled from 2Q 2018 to 1Q 2019. This is followed by another order of 100 Sukhoi Superjet 100 planes, made on 10 September 2018. In addition to the orders, Aeroflot started to phase out its Airbus A330s in October 2019, in anticipation of bringing the Airbus A350s into service. A few months later, Aeroflot took in its first A350 XWB, being the first airline in the CIS and Eastern Europe to do so.

Due to sanctions as a result of the 2022 invasion of Ukraine, aircraft Leasing firms such as AerCap, Avolon and BOC Aviation have terminated leases of Aeroflot's fleet and attempt to repossess its fleet. ACC Aviation Vice President Viktor Berta said "repossessing aircraft could prove challenging, especially if Russian aviation authorities and airlines do not cooperate with lessors."

As of July 2022, Aeroflot ended its own Sukhoi Superjet 100 operations as these had all gradually been transferred to subsidiary Rossiya Airlines.

Notes

References

External links 

 Current Aeroflot fleet

Aeroflot
Lists of aircraft by operator